Curtis Duane Young Jr. (born January 26, 1988) is an American football offensive tackle. He was signed by the Arizona Cardinals as an undrafted free agent in 2011. He played college football at Michigan State.

Early years
He attended J. W. Sexton High School in Lansing, Michigan. He was selected to play in the 2006 Michigan High School Football Coaches Association All-Star Game. He was named to the Detroit Free Press All-State Dream Team in his senior season at high school. He also was selected as the Big Red's Defensive Player of the Year also in his senior season.

College career
He spent his freshman and sophomore seasons at Bowling Green. He transfer to Lansing Community College prior to the 2008 season. He spent his Junior and senior season at Michigan State. He was named Lineman of the Week vs. Northwestern during his junior season. In his Senior season, he was selected to the second-team All-Big Ten. He was selected to the second-team All-Big Ten by Rivals.com and Phil Steele.

Professional career

Arizona Cardinals
On July 26, 2011, he signed with the Arizona Cardinals as an undrafted free agent. On September 2, 2011, he was released. On September 5, he re-signed with the team to join the practice squad. On December 28, 2011, he was promoted to the active roster. On August 31, 2012, he was released on the day of final roster cuts.

Cleveland Browns
On September 11, 2012, he signed with the Cleveland Browns to join the practice squad.

New York Jets
Young was signed by the New York Jets on January 17, 2013, to a reserve/future contract. He was waived on April 30, 2013.

St. Louis Rams
On August 12, 2013, Young was signed by the St. Louis Rams.

Personal life
He is the son of Duane Young and Angela Anderson. His father was a tight end of the National Football League, where he played six seasons. He played for two teams in his NFL career, the San Diego Chargers (1991–1995) and the Buffalo Bills (1998).

References

External links
 Michigan State profile
 Ottawa Redblacks profile

1988 births
Living people
American football offensive tackles
Bowling Green Falcons football players
Michigan State Spartans football players
New York Jets players
St. Louis Rams players
Sportspeople from Lansing, Michigan
Players of American football from Michigan
African-American players of American football
21st-century African-American sportspeople
20th-century African-American people